Zanthoxylum schinifolium, also called mastic-leaf prickly ash, is a species of flowering plant in the Rutaceae, the citrus family. Its peppercorns are the source of the spice Sancho (spice) which is used in Chinese cuisine.

References

External links
Flora of China, 2008

schinifolium